Gouw is a surname. Notable people with the surname include:

Cynthia Gouw (born 1963), American actress and news anchor
Ian Gouw (born 1997), Hong Kong actor, model and musician
Julia S. Gouw, American businesswoman

See also
Jessica De Gouw, Australian actress
Van der Gouw
Gouws
Wu, a Chinese surname sometimes romanised as Gouw